Alderman John Bowen JP (16 December 1844 – 16 April 1926) was a British businessman and was High Sheriff of Worcestershire.

Bowen's father was a blacksmith from Rochford, Worcestershire.

In 1875, he founded the firm of builders, John Bowen and Sons, in Birmingham, which was subsequently responsible for several notable buildings, not least Victoria Law Courts, and several others, on Corporation Street in that city.

He served as a magistrate in Worcestershire, was elected as an alderman for the county in 1892, and was High Sheriff of Worcestershire in 1916–17. Bowen is buried, with his second wife, at Brandwood End Cemetery.

In 2014 the Birmingham Civic Society unveiled a blue plaque in his honour, with the intention of affixing it to another of his buildings, a school now known as The Ark Academy in Tindal Street, in the city's Balsall Heath. The unveiling was attended by three High Sheriffs, for the West Midlands (Tim Watts), Powys (Philip Bowen), and Worcestershire (Michael Hogan), as well as Deputy Lord Lieutenant David Bradnock. Bowen once lived on Tindal Street, and later lived in Moseley, in a house called Rochford (since demolished), on Strensham Hill.

A biography, Alderman John Bowen J.P. 'Honest John by Bowen's great-grandson, Anthony Collins, was published in 2014.

References

Further reading

External links 

 Anthony Collins' site about Bowen

1844 births
Place of birth missing
1926 deaths
Place of death missing
People from Birmingham, West Midlands
Business people from Worcestershire
High Sheriffs of Worcestershire